Minh (Chữ Nôm: 明) is a popular unisex given name of Vietnamese origin, written using the Chinese character (明) meaning "bright", and is also popular among other East Asian names. The Chinese name Ming has the same meaning.

Notable people

As a feminine name
Lê Ngọc Minh Hằng (born 1987), Vietnamese actor and singer
Vũ Thu Minh (born 1977), Vietnamese pop singer

As a masculine name
Đặng Nhật Minh (born 1938), Vietnamese filmmaker
Dương Văn Minh (1916 – 2001), Vietnamese politician and military figure
Ho Chi Minh (ne Nguyễn Sinh Cung; 1890 – 1969), Vietnamese politician
Lê Lương Minh (born 1962), Vietnamese politician and diplomat
Minh Lê (born 1977), Vietnamese-Canadian video game creator
Quyền Văn Minh (born 1954), Vietnamese saxophonist
Minh Alva Vu (born 1990), Vietnamese-American soccer player
Vietnamese names